Kuybyshevo is a rural locality (a selo) in Kuybyshevsky District of Rostov Oblast, Russia. Population:   It is also the administrative center of Kuybyshevsky District.

Geography 
Kuybyshevo is located on the left bank of Mius River. It is close to the border with Ukraine. The Ukrainian territory on the other side of the border is de facto controlled by self-proclaimed Donetsk People's Republic.

History 
The predecessor of the modern selo of Kuybyshevo was Golodayevka sloboda, which was founded in 1777 by colonel Dmitry Martynov.

In April 1820, the region was the location of the largest peasant uprising in the 19th century in Russia, the Martynovsky Riot. With about 30,000 participants, it was the second largest insurrection after that of Pugachev. In July of the same year the revolt was suppressed by general Alexander Chernyshyov, and about four thousand peasants were arrested.

During the Russian Civil War the fighting took place in the area. Golodaevka was taken by Red Army forces led by Nikolay Kuibyshev. In 1935 Golodaevka was renamed to Kuybyshevo in his honor, despite the fact that three years later Kuibyshev executed on charges of spying. The name probably was not changed because of confusion between Nikolay Kuibyshev and his brother Valerian Kuybyshev, a prominent Soviet politician who also died in 1935.

Places of interest 
 , a Russian Orthodox church built in 1860.
 Kuybyshevo Forest, a natural monument and a protected area.

References

Rural localities in Rostov Oblast